The Punjab Social Security Hospital is a 610-bed teaching hospital in Lahore, Pakistan 

It is situated on Multan Road, in south western part of Lahore. This hospital mainly provides free care for employees and families of industrial units in Punjab. It was built and is run by a public sector department PESSI (Punjab Employees Social Security Institution).

Hospitals
 Social Security Hospital Multan Road Lahore
 Maternity and New Born Childcare Hospital Faisalabad
 Social Security Hospital Shandara
 Social Security Hospital Sheikhupura
 Social Security Hospital Gujranwala
 Social Security Hospital Sialkot
 Social Security Hospital Okara
 Social Security Hospital Islamabad
 Social Security Hospital Gujrat
 Social Security Hospital Kot Lakhpat
 Social Security Hospital Jauharabad
 Social Security Hospital Jarranwala
 Khawaja Fareed Social Security Hospital (KFSSH) Multan
 Social Security Hospital Faisalabad
 Social Security Hospital Sahiwal
 Social Security Hospital Jhang

Accredited hospital
This hospital is accredited by the College of Physicians and Surgeons Pakistan.

References

Hospitals in Lahore
Teaching hospitals in Pakistan